Ernst Lindner (11 March 1935 – 11 October 2012) was a German international footballer.

Lindner played 6 matches for the East Germany.

In the 1956 season of the Oberliga he was the topscorer with 18 goals. Overall Ernst Lindner scored 41 goals in the East German top-flight.

References

1935 births
2012 deaths
Association football forwards
East German footballers
East Germany international footballers
1. FC Lokomotive Leipzig players
East German football managers